Thanyasuda Wongya (born 10 November 1998) is a Thai badminton player.

Achievements

BWF International Challenge/Series (3 runners-up) 
Women's doubles

Mixed doubles

  BWF International Challenge tournament
  BWF International Series tournament
  BWF Future Series tournament

References

External links 
 

Living people
1998 births
Thanyasuda Wongya
Thanyasuda Wongya
Thanyasuda Wongya